Cucullia eulepis is a species of moth in the family Noctuidae (the owlet moths). It is found in North America.

The MONA or Hodges number for Cucullia eulepis is 10209.

References

Further reading

 
 

Cucullia
Moths described in 1876